The  is a metro electric multiple unit (EMU) train type operated by the Yokohama City Transportation Bureau on the Yokohama Municipal Subway Blue Line in Japan since 2022.

Formation 
The sets have four powered cars and two leading trailer cars, and are formed as follows.

Interior 
Longitudinal bucket seating is used throughout.

Technical details 
Construction is of stainless steel. The trains use a VVVF traction control system that allows for full regenerative braking. The trains have a maximum design speed of  but are limited to  during operation.

History 
On 13 December 2021, the Yokohama Municipal Subway announced that new trainsets would be purchased for the Blue Line, replacing the oldest 3000A series trainsets dating back to 1992.

The order was originally made in 2018 for a new batch of 3000V series trainsets but that plan was abandoned in favour of newer 4000 series cars.

, five trainsets (30 vehicles) are to be commissioned in 2022 while the remaining three sets (18 vehicles) will enter service in 2023.

The first trainset entered service on 2 May 2022.

References

External links 

 Press release (in Japanese)

3000 series
Electric multiple units of Japan
Train-related introductions in 2022
750 V DC multiple units
Kawasaki multiple units